Dinosaurus is an extinct genus of therapsid of controversial affinities. Its type and only species is Dinosaurus murchisonii. It is only known from a partial snout from the Permian of Russia. Its taxonomic history is intertwined with several other poorly-known Russian therapsids, particularly Rhopalodon, Brithopus, and Phthinosuchus.

Dinosaurus is not a dinosaur; the similarity in names is coincidental. Dinosaurs are reptiles, whereas Dinosaurus is a therapsid, and as such, more closely related to mammals. Dinosauria was named only five years prior to Dinosaurus, in 1842.

History of study

The holotype of Dinosaurus murchisonii was collected in a copper mine in the Orenburg Governorate of the Russian Empire during the 1840s. It was collected in two pieces, found on separate occasions. The director of the mine, Wagenheim von Qualen, initially identified the first piece as a plant fossil in a letter to Johann Fischer von Waldheim, but Fischer realized it was part of a skull and described it as a new species of Rhopalodon, R. murchisonii, in 1845. In 1847, Fischer described the second piece and established a new genus, Dinosaurus, for the species. In 1848, Eichwald recognized that the two specimens were not only from the same species, but fit together as parts of the same individual. He provisionally returned the species to Rhopalodon, as he felt there were not enough differences yet identified to justify a second genus, and noted the existence of the similarly-named taxon Dinosauria, named by Richard Owen only a few years prior, in 1842.

Wagenheim von Qualen donated both specimens to the collection of Maximilian de Beuharnais, Duke of Leuchtenberg, and the originals have since been lost. However, casts of the specimens are housed in the Paleontological Institute, Russian Academy of Sciences under the catalog numbers PIN 296/1 and PIN 296/2.

In 1894, H. G. Seeley remarked that Cliorhizodon, which is now regarded as a junior synonym of Syodon, could not be distinguished from Dinosaurus. In 1954, Ivan Efremov synonymized Dinosaurus with Brithopus. This has been followed by some other authors, but Christian Kammerer has regarded Brithopus, which is based on only a partial humerus, as a nomen dubium, and as such did not regard Dinosaurus as synonymous with it.

In 2000, M. F. Ivakhnenko synonymized Phthinosuchus with Dinosaurus. As such, he classified Dinosaurus in the family Phthinosuchidae, which he grouped with Rubidgeidae in the superfamily Rubidgeoidea of the order Gorgonopia. Kammerer has remarked that the limited anatomical information available for Dinosaurus makes it hard to confirm this proposed synonymy.

See also

Gresslyosaurus – Originally was to be called "Dinosaurus"

Footnotes

References

Works cited

 

 Monotypic prehistoric animal genera
 Fossils of Russia
 Fossil taxa described in 1845